Holy Cross Secondary School may refer to:
 Holy Cross Catholic Secondary School (St. Catharines) in St. Catharines, Ontario, Canada
 Holy Cross Secondary School (Peterborough), in Peterborough, Ontario, Canada
 Holy Cross Secondary School (Zambia)